State Highway 47 (SH 47) is a New Zealand state highway in the central North Island.

For its entire length, SH 47 is a single carriageway road with one lane in each direction and at-grade intersections and property accesses. There are no significant towns on the route. The New Zealand Transport Agency classifies the section of SH 47 as an arterial route south of the  intersection and a primary collector route north of the SH 46 intersection.

Route
SH 47 continues for a further 25 km over the Te Ponanga Saddle until it reaches its terminus with SH 41. From here eastbound is a short distance to Turangi.

Route Changes and Former Spurs
SH 47 used to have a spur road, SH 47A, which ran from Lake Rotoaira Road to SH 1 at Rangipo. In the 1980s this highway became part of SH 47 and the spur road revoked. A few years later SH 47 was rerouted back to its original route.

In 1997 the formerly designated section of SH 47A regained state highway status as a new designation of SH 46.

Major junctions

See also
List of New Zealand state highways

References

External links
 New Zealand Transport Agency

47
Ruapehu District
Transport in Manawatū-Whanganui